The Swedish National Road Race Championships have been held since 1930.

Men

Women

See also
Swedish National Time Trial Championships
National Road Cycling Championships

References
Svenska Mästare, landsväg linje, Retrieved July 8, 2016
Svenska Mästare, landsväg tempo, Retrieved July 8, 2016

National road cycling championships
Cycle races in Sweden
Recurring sporting events established in 1930
1930 establishments in Sweden